Paul Simon (born 1941) is an American musician and songwriter.

Paul Simon may also refer to:
 Paul Ludwig Simon (1771–1815), German architect and professor
 Paul Simon (politician) (1928–2003), United States Representative and Senator from Illinois
 Paul Simon (drummer) (born 1950), British punk rock and New Wave drummer
 Paul Simon (album), a 1972 self-titled album by the American musician Paul Simon
"Paul Simon", a 2005 song by The Russian Futurists

See also
Paul E. Simons, U.S. diplomat
Paul Simonon (born 1955), English rock bassist, most notably of the Clash
Paul Symon (born 1960), Director-General of the Australian Secret Intelligence Service